Events from the year 1566 in France.

Incumbents 
Monarch – Charles IX of France

Events
  Ordonnance of Moulins prohibits writing, printing or selling of defamatory books and requires all books published to carry a seal of state approval.

Births
 February 1 – Marie of the Incarnation, Discalced Carmelite beatified nun and blessed (d. 1618)
 November 3 – Charles, Count of Soissons, prince du sang and military commander (d. 1612)
 date unknown
 Claude Dausque, Jesuit (d. 1644)
 Françoise de Montmorency-Fosseux, mistress of King Henry III of Navarre (d. 1614)
 Claude de La Trémoille, nobleman (d. 1604)

Deaths
 April 25
 Diane de Poitiers, mistress of King Henry II of France (b. 1499)
 Louise Labé, poet (b. c. 1524)
 July 2 – Nostradamus, astrologer (b. 1503)
 July 30 – Guillaume Rondelet, doctor (b. 1507)
 date unknown – Charles Dumoulin, jurist (b. 1500)

See also

References

1560s in France